Nancy Drew... Reporter is a 1939 American comedy-mystery film directed by William Clemens and written by Kenneth Gamet. The film stars Bonita Granville as Nancy Drew, John Litel, Frankie Thomas, Mary Lee, Dickie Jones and Larry Williams. The film was released by Warner Bros. on February 18, 1939.

Plot 
Nancy Drew, competing in the local newspaper's amateur reporter contest, attempts to clear a girl named Eula Denning of murder charges with the help of long-suffering Ted and the two brats from next door.  Nancy rockets through a car chase, a song fest in a Chinese restaurant, a boxing bout, and a finale of whistling fireworks to catch the real killer.

Cast 
 Bonita Granville as Nancy Drew
 John Litel as Carson Drew
 Frankie Thomas as Ted Nickerson
 Mary Lee as Mary Nickerson
 Dickie Jones as Killer Parkins
 Larry Williams as Miles Lambert
 Betty Amann as Eula Denning
 Thomas E. Jackson as City Editor Bostwick
 Olin Howland as Sergeant Entwhistle
 Sheila Bromley as Bonnie Lucas
 Art Smith as News Editor
 Jimmy Conlin as Newspaper Morgue Librarian (uncredited)
 Charles Halton as Whitney (uncredited) 
 Frank Mayo as Man Leaving Courthouse (uncredited) 
 Jack Mower as Deputy Coroner (uncredited) 
 Leo White as Newspaper Office Worker (uncredited)

References

External links 
 
 
 
 
 

1939 films
1930s mystery comedy-drama films
1930s teen films
American teen comedy-drama films
American mystery comedy-drama films
American crime comedy-drama films
American black-and-white films
Films directed by William Clemens
Films based on Nancy Drew
Teen mystery films
1930s crime comedy-drama films
Warner Bros. films
Films scored by Heinz Roemheld
1939 comedy films
1939 drama films
1930s English-language films
1930s American films